Granger is an unincorporated community in Medina County, in the U.S. state of Ohio.

History
A post office called Granger was established in 1816, and remained in operation until 1901. Granger has the name of Gideon Granger, a member the Connecticut House of Representatives and 4th United States Postmaster General. A former variant name was Grangerburg.

References

Unincorporated communities in Medina County, Ohio
Unincorporated communities in Ohio